Sacred Heart College, Tirupattur is a general degree college located in Tirupattur, Vellore district, in Tamil Nadu, India. It was established in 1951. The college is affiliated with Thiruvalluvar University. This college offers courses in arts, commerce and science.

History of the Institute 
Very Rev. Fr. Joseph Carreno SDB, a missionary from Spain founded Sacred Heart College in the year 1951. It started functioning with 10 teachers and 81 students and in a short period of six decades, it has grown into a postgraduate and research institution. With the view to cater to the needs of the deserving local students, the college also offers undergraduate courses and postgraduate courses in the Evening College on self-financing basis.

Recognizing its academic contributions, the University of Madras conferred the autonomous status on the postgraduate courses of MSW (Social Work) and M.Sc. (Mathematics) from the academic year 1987–88. Subsequently, in the year 1988–89, autonomous status was conferred on the postgraduate course of M.A. (Economics) and on all the undergraduate courses. Meanwhile, the Evening College affiliated to Thiruvalluvar University, Vellore, was functioning in the non-autonomous mode. The College received the approval from AICTE (All India Council for Technical Education) to commence MCA programme on self-financing basis from the academic year 1998–99.

In the same year, the College was accredited for the first time by NAAC with Four Stars. In 2000, the College initiated evening study centres for the poor students in different villages around Tirupattur. The economically poor students were chosen to teach in these study centres and they were given work-scholarships. The golden jubilee of the College was celebrated in 2001 and a memorial building was opened to accommodate additional departments which were started. In 2003, the Madras University was bifurcated and Sacred Heart College came under the Thiruvalluvar University. In the same year, Amalgam hostel was started to accommodate the post graduate girl students in the campus.

The year 2016 saw a new entrance and a new building (Bicentenary Building) to accommodate more number of departments. In the same year restructuring of all the courses were done after a long process of consultation and academic audit of all departments.

Courses offered

PG Diploma Programmes (Self – Financed Section)

References

External links

Educational institutions established in 1951
1951 establishments in Madras State
Colleges affiliated to Thiruvalluvar University
Academic institutions formerly affiliated with the University of Madras
Universities and colleges in Vellore district